This is an index of a series of comprehensive lists of continents, countries, and first level administrative country subdivisions such as states, provinces, and territories, as well as certain political and geographic features of substantial area. Some divisions are listed twice, with one listing including territory that is excluded in the other for various reasons, including territorial disputes. There is intentional overlap between the lists in order to maximize ease of use.

Longer lists
List of political and geographic subdivisions by total area (all) 
List of political and geographic subdivisions by total area in excess of 200,000 square kilometers
List of political and geographic subdivisions by total area from 100,000 to 1,000,000 square kilometers
List of political and geographic subdivisions by total area from 50,000 to 200,000 square kilometers
List of political and geographic subdivisions by total area from 20,000 to 50,000 square kilometers
List of political and geographic subdivisions by total area from 5,000 to 20,000 square kilometers
List of political and geographic subdivisions by total area from 1,000 to 5,000 square kilometers
List of political and geographic subdivisions by total area from 0.1 to 1,000 square kilometers

Shorter lists
List of political and geographic subdivisions by total area in excess of 1,000,000 square kilometers
List of political and geographic subdivisions by total area from 500,000 to 1,000,000 square kilometers
List of political and geographic subdivisions by total area from 200,000 to 500,000 square kilometers
List of political and geographic subdivisions by total area from 100,000 to 200,000 square kilometers
List of political and geographic subdivisions by total area from 50,000 to 100,000 square kilometers
List of political and geographic subdivisions by total area from 30,000 to 50,000 square kilometers
List of political and geographic subdivisions by total area from 20,000 to 30,000 square kilometers
List of political and geographic subdivisions by total area from 10,000 to 20,000 square kilometers
List of political and geographic subdivisions by total area from 7,000 to 10,000 square kilometers
List of political and geographic subdivisions by total area from 5,000 to 7,000 square kilometers
List of political and geographic subdivisions by total area from 3,000 to 5,000 square kilometers
List of political and geographic subdivisions by total area from 1,000 to 3,000 square kilometers
List of political and geographic subdivisions by total area from 250 to 1,000 square kilometers
List of political and geographic subdivisions by total area from 0.1 to 250 square kilometers

See also
List of countries and dependencies by area
List of administrative divisions by country
:Category:Ranked lists of country subdivisions
List of largest empires
Orders of magnitude (area)

References

Ranked lists of country subdivisions
Geography-related lists
Political and geographical subdivisions